The Wellington Group or Wellington School was a group of poets who worked and lived in and around Wellington, the capital of New Zealand, in the 1950s and 1960s.

History

The movement started with Louis Johnson, who started up the Poetry Yearbook which ran from 1951 to 1964. In part, it was a reaction to Allen Curnow's dictum of localism in NZ poetry, emphasising universalism, but both the Wellington Group and Curnow liked to use some degree of Māori symbolism.

Another significant publication was Numbers, which ran 1954–1960.

Members
 James K. Baxter
 Peter Bland
 Alistair Te Ariki Campbell
 Gordon Challis
 Louis Johnson

References
 Ousby (ed) Cambridge Companion to Literature in English (1993)

New Zealand poetry
History of New Zealand
Culture in Wellington
1950s in New Zealand
1960s in New Zealand
1950s in Wellington
1960s in Wellington
20th-century New Zealand literature
Literary movements